Marek Garmulewicz (born 22 January 1968 in Mozgawa) is a Polish former wrestler who competed in the 1992 Summer Olympics, in the 1996 Summer Olympics, in the 2000 Summer Olympics, and in the 2004 Summer Olympics.

References

External links
 

1968 births
Living people
Olympic wrestlers of Poland
Wrestlers at the 1992 Summer Olympics
Wrestlers at the 1996 Summer Olympics
Wrestlers at the 2000 Summer Olympics
Polish male sport wrestlers
Wrestlers at the 2004 Summer Olympics
People from Pińczów County
Sportspeople from Świętokrzyskie Voivodeship
20th-century Polish people
21st-century Polish people